Barbara Meyer may refer to:

 Barbara J. Meyer (born 1949), biologist
 Barbara Meyer (curler), Swiss curler, 1983 World champion
 Barbara Meyer (cyclist) (born 1982), Austrian racing cyclist